The NRL match officials are a select group of trained professional and semi-professional rugby league match officials who officiate in the National Rugby League (NRL) and lower tier rugby league competitions, including the Holden Cup, the Intrust Super Premiership NSW and the Intrust Super Cup.

Current Officials

Referees

Sideline Officials

Emerging referees squad

Women In League Officials

Coaches

See also

List of National Rugby League referees
RFL Match officials

References

National Rugby League referees